Trish Gresham (born March 5, 1996) is an American professional wrestler and powerlifter currently signed to Impact Wrestling, where she performs under the ring name Jordynne Grace. She is a former two-time Impact Knockouts World Champion. She is also a former one-time Impact Digital Media Champion and Impact Knockouts Tag Team Champion. Upon becoming the inaugural Digital Media Champion, Grace was recognized by Impact Wrestling as the first Knockouts Triple Crown winner.

She is also known for her appearances in Beyond Wrestling, Progress Wrestling, Pro-Wrestling: EVE, and Shine Wrestling.

Professional wrestling career

Independent circuit (2018–present) 
On September 1, 2018, Grace participated in a 19-person over budget battle royale to determine the number one contender to the ROH World Championship on All In, being the only female in the match. Grace was able to eliminate Brian Cage, but was ultimately eliminated by Bully Ray. On October 28, Grace unsuccessfully challenged Jazz for the NWA World Women's Championship on Women's Wrestling Revolution (WWR), as they main evented at the WWR's event WWR vs. The World.

Impact Wrestling

Knockouts Champion (2018–2020) 

On October 16, 2018, it was reported that Grace had signed a two-year deal with Impact Wrestling. Grace made her Impact! debut on the November 8 episode, as she defeated Katarina. On the January 3, 2019 episode of Impact!, Grace rescued Kiera Hogan as she was attacked by Allie and Su Yung. That led into a tag team match at Homecoming, which they lost as Yung technically submitted Hogan. With Rosemary's return to Impact, Grace teamed with her and Hogan to defeat Allie, Su Yung and The Undead Maid of Honor in the "Dark War". On the March 15 episode of Impact!, Grace defeated Tessa Blanchard to become the number one contender for Taya Valkyrie's Impact Knockouts Championship. At Against All Odds, which aired on March 29, Grace won by count-out, however, Valkyrie remained the champion. On the April 9 episode of Impact!, she received another chance to become number one contender for Valkyrie's title by defeating Madison Rayne. On August 2, at Unbreakable, she teamed with Scott Steiner and Petey Williams to defeat Dicky Mayer, Gentleman Jervis and Ryan Taylor in a six-person tag team match.

On January 12, 2020, Grace had another opportunity for the Knockouts Championship at Hard To Kill against Taya Valkyrie and ODB, but Valkyrie retained when she covered ODB. On January 18 (which aired on tape delay on February 11), she defeated Valkyrie to win the championship. After successfully retaining the title against Havok on February 22 at Sacrifice, Grace declared an open challenge with the Knockouts Championship on the line, which Madison Rayne answered by sending Miranda Alize and Lacey Ryan on the February 25 and March 10 episodes of Impact! respectively, but they failed to beat her. On July 18 at Slammiversary, Grace lost the title to Deonna Purrazzo, ending her reign at 182 days. A rematch was scheduled on August 25 during the second night of Impact's Emergence special, in the first Knockouts 30-minute Iron man match in Impact history, where Grace lost to Purrazzo, two falls to one.

Grace then entered into a rivalry with Tenille Dashwood when she returned on the September 1 episode of Impact!, interrupting her confrontation with Knockouts Champion Deonna Purrazzo during her Black Tie Affair. She lost their first match on the September 22 episode of Impact!, but won the rematch the following week, culminating in a final match and win by Dashwood on October 3 at Victory Road. On the October 6 episode of Impact!, Grace answered X Division Champion Rohit Raju's open challenge for the title and beat him, but he changed the rules so that it wasn't up for grabs. At Bound for Glory, she competed in a six-way intergender scramble match that involved Chris Bey, TJP, Willie Mack, Trey Miguel and Raju, who won to retain the X Division Championship. At Turning Point, she teamed up with Dashwood in a losing effort against Rosemary and Taya Valkyrie.

Championship reigns (2020–present) 
On the November 24 episode of Impact!, Grace revealed that her partner for the Impact Knockouts Tag Team Championship Tournament was former WWE Women's Champion and NWA World Women's Champion Jazz. The duo would debut as a team on the December 1 episode of Impact!, defeating Killer Kelly and Renee Michelle in the first round, but lose to Havok and Nevaeh in the second round on the January 5, 2021 episode of Impact!. Their lost led to a match at Genesis, where Grace defeated Jazz. On the February 23 episode of Impact!, Grace and Jazz defeated Kimber Lee and Susan to become number one contenders to the Knockouts Tag Team Championship, held by Fire 'N Flava (Kiera Hogan and Tasha Steelz). The two teams fought at Sacrifice, where Grace and Jazz failed to win the tag titles.

At Hardcore Justice, she competed in a weapons match to determine the number one contender for the Knockouts title, which was won by Tenille Dashwood. On the April 15 episode of Impact!, Grace teamed with Jazz in her final match and beat Fire 'N Flava in an impromptu non-title bout after they interrupted her retirement ceremony. The following week, she defeated Hogan by disqualification and was beaten up by her and Steelz, before being saved by a debuting Rachael Ellering. Three days later, at Rebellion, Grace and Ellering defeated Fire 'N Flava to win the Knockouts Tag Team Championship for the first time. On May 7, it was announced that Grace had signed a new multi-year deal with Impact Wrestling. Eight days later, at Under Siege, she and Ellering dropped the titles back to Fire 'N Flava. On the May 20 episode of Impact!, Grace challenged Ellering to a match but failed to win. On the June 3 episode of Impact!, she and Ellering challenged Fire 'N Flava to a rematch for the Knockouts Tag Team Championship, but failed to regain them. Nine days later, at Against All Odds, Grace lost to Dashwood.

On July 31 at Homecoming, Grace teamed with Petey Williams to compete in a tournament to crown a Homecoming King and Queen, but lost to Matt Cardona and Chelsea Green in the first round. In October, Grace competed in the Shannon "Daffney" Spruill Memorial Monster's Ball match at Knockouts Knockdown, which was won by Savannah Evans. She then entered a tournament to determine the inaugural Impact Digital Media Champion, where she defeated Johnny Swinger in the first round. At Bound for Glory, Grace defeated Green, Crazzy Steve, Fallah Bahh, John Skyler, and Madison Rayne in the final to win the Impact Digital Media Championship. Having won the Digital Media title, Grace was then recognized by Impact Wrestling as the first Knockouts Triple Crown winner in the promotion's history.

On January 8, 2022, at Hard to Kill, Grace participated in the inaugural Knockouts Ultimate X match, which was won by Tasha Steelz. On the February 3 episode of Impact!, Grace lost the Impact Digital Media Championship to Matt Cardona after he hit her with a steel chair. At No Surrender, she fought Cardona in a title rematch, but lost by disqualification after delivering a low blow. On the February 24 episode of Impact!, Grace challenged for the title again in a Dotcombat match, but failed to win. On the March 31 episode of Impact!, she competed in a Knockouts World Championship #1 Contenders Battle Royal, which was won by Rosemary. At Multiverse of Matches, Grace competed in an Ultimate X match for the X Division Championship, which was won by Trey Miguel. On April 23 at Rebellion, she teamed with W. Morrissey in an Eight-Team Elimination Challenge for the Impact World Tag Team Championship, but were eliminated by The Major Players (Cardona and Brian Myers). On June 19 at Slammiversary, Grace won the Knockouts World Championship for a second time in the inaugural Queen of the Mountain match.

On July 1 at Against All Odds, Grace successfully defended the Knockouts World Championship against Tasha Steelz in a rematch. On July 31, at Ric Flair's Last Match event, Grace retained her title in a three-way match involving Deonna Purrazzo and Rachael Ellering. On August 12 at Emergence, Grace made another successful title defense against Mia Yim. On September 23 at Victory Road, she defeated Max the Impaler (Masha Slamovich's handpicked opponent) in a Pick Your Poison match. At Bound for Glory, Grace defeated Slamovich to retain her title, thus ending Slamovich's undefeated streak in Impact Wrestling. On the November 10 episode of Impact!, Grace made another successful title defense against Gisele Shaw, but was attacked by Slamovich afterwards. Eight days later, at Over Drive, Grace defeated Slamovich in a Last Knockout Standing match to retain her title.

On January 13, 2023, at Hard To Kill, Grace lost the Knockouts World Championship to Mickie James in a Title vs. Career match, ending her reign at 208 days.

Personal life 
On December 21, 2018, Parker announced her engagement to fellow professional wrestler Jonathan Gresham. The couple married in September 2020.

Championships and accomplishments

Powerlifting 
 Federation Records
 World Natural Powerlifting Federation (WNPF) Records

Professional wrestling 
 Battle Club Pro
 BCP ICONS Championship (1 time)
 Black Label Pro
 BLP Heavyweight Championship (1 time)
 Impact Wrestling
 Impact Digital Media Championship (1 time, Inaugural)
 Impact Knockouts World Championship (2 times)
 Impact Knockouts Tag Team Championship (1 time) – with Rachael Ellering
 Impact Digital Media Championship Tournament (2021)
 First Knockouts Triple Crown winner
 2022 Queen of the Mountain
 IMPACT Year End Awards (2 times)
 Knockouts Tag Team of the Year (2021) – with Rachael Ellering
 Knockout of the Year (2022)
 Lancaster Championship Wrestling
 LCW Vixen Championship (1 time)
 Lucha Libre AAA Worldwide
Lucha Libre World Cup: 2023 Women's division – with Deonna Purrazzo and Kamille
 NOVA Pro Wrestling
 Women's Commonwealth Cup (2018)
 Progress Wrestling
 Progress World Women's Championship (1 time)
 Revelations of Divine Love Tournament (2019)
 Pro Wrestling Illustrated
 Ranked No. 6 of the top 150 female wrestlers in the PWI Women's 150 in 2022
Ranked No. 97 of the top 500 singles wrestlers in the PWI 500 in 2022
 Pro Wrestling Magic
 PWM Women's Championship (1 time)
 Sports Illustrated
 Ranked No. 9 of the top 10 women's wrestlers in 2019
 Universal Independent Wrestling
 LOUIS Ladies Tag Team Championships (1 time) - with Nina Monet
 Women Superstars Uncensored
 WSU Spirit Championship (1 time)
 Women's Wrestling Revolution
 Tournament For Tomorrow (2017)
 World Series Wrestling
 WSW Women's Championship (2 times, inaugural, current)
 Zelo Pro Wrestling
 Zelo Pro Women's Championship (1 time)

References

External links 

 
 

1996 births
21st-century American women
21st-century professional wrestlers
American female professional wrestlers
Living people
Professional wrestlers from Texas
Sportspeople from Austin, Texas
TNA/Impact Knockouts World Champions
TNA/Impact Knockouts World Tag Team Champions
Impact Digital Media Champions
Progress Wrestling World Women's Champions
American powerlifters